Henry Ingwersen (born January 4, 1951), is an American politician from Maine. A Democrat, Ingwersen has represented District 10 in the Maine House of Representatives since 2018. In 2020, he was defeated for reelection by former Representative Wayne Parry.

References

1951 births
Living people
People from Arundel, Maine
Democratic Party members of the Maine House of Representatives
21st-century American politicians
Goddard College alumni
University of Southern Maine alumni